Nepal Electricity Authority (NEA), founded on 16 August 1985, is the parent generator and distributor of electric power under the supervision of the government of Nepal.

NEA owns Hydroelectric Plants connected to the grid amounting to 480 Megawatts. It also buys power from Independent Power Producers (IPP) amounting to 230 Megawatts. It operates two fuel operated plants generating 53 Megawatts of Electricity. The total capacity of the Integrated Nepal Power System (INPS) which NEA operates stands at 1095 Megawatts. Various projects are underway to help meet the electricity demand but these have been plagued by delays. However after many such delays Nepal has seen a positive change in electricity production and distribution. For the first time, NEA was in profit. Loadshedding was ended under the leadership of Kul Man Ghising.

Total Sales of Electricity (GWh) 4,764.678       2017
Total Available Electric Energy (GWh) 6,257.73  2017

Power trade department

Independent power producers (operational)

Operational hydro power projects of independent power producers (greater than 10 MW), total capacity 302.866 MW:

Data from NEA as of Jan 14, 2016

Independent power producers (under construction)

Hydropower projects of independent power producers (under construction and greater than 10 MW), total capacity 1,617 MW:

Data from NEA as of Jan 14, 2016

Hydropower projects

Hydropower projects greater than 10 MW, total capacity 750 MW:

Solar Power Stations

Diesel Power Stations

See also
Independent Power Producers Association, Nepal (IPPAN)

References

External links
Official website

Electricity authorities
Energy in Nepal
Organisations based in Nepal
Regulatory agencies of Nepal
1985 establishments in Nepal